The English port city of Portsmouth has a wide variety of places of worship representing many Christian denominations and other faith groups.  There were 101 in the city: 76 churches, chapels, halls and meeting rooms for various Christian groups, three mosques, a synagogue and a gurdwara were in use, and a further 20 buildings no longer serve a religious function but survive in alternative uses.  Portsmouth is in the southeast of the traditional and ceremonial county of Hampshire, although it is now administered as a separate unitary authority; it spreads across the whole of Portsea Island and on to the mainland to the north, and is the most densely populated city in the United Kingdom.  The city area is wholly urban, but most of its growth occurred between the 18th and 20th centuries, and very few churches were founded before this.  Portsmouth is the seat of two dioceses and therefore has two cathedrals: the mother church of Anglican Diocese of Portsmouth is the Cathedral Church of St Thomas of Canterbury, founded in the 12th century as a parish church, while the Roman Catholic Diocese of Portsmouth is based at the Cathedral of St John the Evangelist, founded in 1880.

The 2011 United Kingdom census reported that just over half of residents are Christian. The largest number of churches in the city belong to the Church of England—the country's Established Church—but many other denominations have worshipped continuously in Portsmouth for centuries.  Roman Catholics established their first chapel in the 1790s and now have six churches in the city as well as the cathedral.  Among Nonconformist groups, the first Baptist church opened before 1700; Methodism emerged in the 18th century, its Wesleyan branch being particularly strong locally; a Unitarian church was founded more than 300 years ago; and all the United Reformed congregations in the city can trace their roots back to a chapel of 1754.  Other denominations and groups represented in the city include Christian Scientists, Jehovah's Witnesses, various Pentecostal groups and Plymouth Brethren.

Historic England has awarded listed status to 21 current and three former places of worship in Portsmouth. A building is defined as "listed" when it is placed on a statutory register of buildings of "special architectural or historic interest" in accordance with the Planning (Listed Buildings and Conservation Areas) Act 1990. The Department for Digital, Culture, Media and Sport, a Government department, is responsible for this; Historic England, a non-departmental public body, acts as an agency of the department to administer the process and advise the department on relevant issues. There are three grades of listing status. Grade I, the highest, is defined as being of "exceptional interest"; Grade II* is used for "particularly important buildings of more than special interest"; and Grade II, the lowest, is used for buildings of "special interest".  Portsmouth City Council also grants locally listed status to buildings of local architectural or historic interest which are not on the statutory register; ten current and three former places of worship have this status.

Overview of the city and its places of worship

Urban development on Portsea Island started in the 12th century, when "a flourishing little town" developed around Portsmouth Harbour and Southwick Priory founded a chapel—the present Cathedral Church of St Thomas of Canterbury.  In 1212, Domus Dei, an almshouse, hospice and chapel which was later used as the Royal Garrison Church, was established nearby.  Until the 1750s the only other church on Portsea Island was the original parish church of St Mary in present-day Kingston; other medieval churches were found at Widley, Wymering and Farlington, which were outside the Portsmouth boundary until the 20th century.  St Thomas of Canterbury was parished in the 14th century, and St Mary's gradually became ruinous.  Nevertheless it retained its status as parish church of the rest of Portsea Island outside the old town, and only two other Anglican churches were built before 1800: St George's and St John the Evangelist's.  Both were proprietary chapels: the former opened in 1754 as a chapel of ease to St Mary's, and St John the Evangelist's served as "the stronghold of [Anglican] Evangelism" and Low church tradition from its opening in 1789 until its destruction by World War II bombs in 1941.

The great expansion of the city's population in the 19th and early 20th centuries prompted the construction of many new Anglican churches and mission halls across the whole island.  Some of the architecture was "dull and pedestrian", and many were built cheaply, but some were on a more ambitious and grand scale.  More than 20 Anglican churches opened between 1800 and 1914, and at the end of that period further impetus was given by the establishment of the Bishop of Winchester's "Six Churches Fund" to provide money to build or rebuild more: this was responsible for what Nikolaus Pevsner described as the "remarkable outburst of building in a variety of styles" at that time.  Also of the pre-World War II era is "one of [the] most famous and original churches" by Ninian Comper, the architecturally eclectic St Philip's Church (1936–38), in the unlikely setting of the "dead-end suburbia" of Cosham's Highbury estate.  Many Anglican churches were damaged or destroyed during World War II, and most were not replaced.  The "beautiful and sensitive" restoration of the Church of the Holy Spirit in the 1950s brought the 150-year era of intensive churchbuilding in the city to an end: as congregations and financial resources have reduced, more churches have closed or been replaced by smaller buildings (as at St Mark's, North End) or adapted into multi-purpose community facilities (as at St Cuthbert's, Copnor).

Roman Catholics

In the 18th century, Portsea Island's few Roman Catholics travelled to Gosport to attend Mass, crossing Portsmouth Harbour in a rowing boat, or to Havant.  Both of these missions were in private chapels in houses belonging to Catholic families, as churches for public worship could not be built until the passing of the Roman Catholic Relief Act 1791.  In that year or 1792 a temporary chapel opened in central Portsmouth.  Four years later a permanent church was built behind houses on Prince George Street.  As the population grew it was enlarged in the mid-19th century, galleries were added and a schoolroom was built.  It was superseded by the present cathedral, but survived in commercial use until 1965.  The present Cathedral of St John the Evangelist was founded in 1880 and was raised to cathedral status two years later when the Diocese of Portsmouth was created.  Two years later a mission dedicated to Our Lady and St Swithun was founded in Southsea, and a tin tabernacle was erected to serve as a chapel of ease.  The present St Swithun's Church replaced it in 1901.  In 1893 a second mission was established in the North End district, and Corpus Christi became Portsmouth's third Catholic church.  St Joseph's Church was built in 1914 to serve the Copnor district, where Mass had been celebrated since 1908, and a church opened in a converted garage in 1937 in Eastney.  The permanent replacement, a prefabricated building dedicated to Our Lady of Lourdes, opened in 1956.  On the mainland, churches were built in Cosham (1928) and on the Paulsgrove estate (1970).  Other churches in the city with a Catholic tradition are St Agatha's Church at Landport (originally Anglican, but now affiliated with the Roman Catholic Church through the Personal Ordinariate of Our Lady of Walsingham) and the Church of Our Lady Help of Christians in Kingston, part of the traditionalist Society of Saint Pius X.

Methodists

Methodism "has had an important influence on the religious and social life of Portsmouth" since the 18th century.  As in many other parts of the country, the three main branches of Methodism were represented: in 1910, the 20 chapels within the city boundaries consisted of 12 for Wesleyans and four each for Primitive Methodists and Bible Christians.  John Wesley visited Portsmouth 22 times in the 38 years from 1753, both to encourage the spread of Wesleyanism and to "control [the] rapidly expanding organisation" as it began to grow at pace in the city.  The importance of Portsmouth as an early centre of Wesleyanism was confirmed when it became a Circuit in its own right in 1790.  All the denomination's chapels can trace their origins back to one of three parents.  The original Wesleyan place of worship of 1767, merely a room, was replaced by a permanent chapel in 1788.  This was superseded by another on Pembroke Road in 1811, and from this chapel the Eastney church and three others (now demolished) were founded.  In 1768 a meeting house was established on Bishop Street.  Its congregation transferred to a converted Anglican church in 1800, and this church helped to found the present Trinity Methodist Church in Southsea.  Both of the early chapels contributed to the cost of the 850-capacity Arundel Street Chapel, built in 1845 and bombed in 1941, and this founded churches at Copnor, Drayton and Wymering and three others which have been demolished. Portsmouth was also one of the most important locations in Southern England for Bible Christians from the time they first became established in the early 1820s. Their chapel at Brougham Road in Somerstown (1876) is now an art gallery, the Fawcett Road church in Southsea (1893) is in residential use, and the church at Powerscourt Road in North End (1903) was sold to Baptists after World War II.  The Primitive Methodist movement was never as strong, but their Jubilee Chapel of 1861 survives as a Pentecostal church and their building at Eastney was taken over by an Evangelical congregation.

Baptists

Baptists have been established in Portsmouth for even longer than Methodists: the earliest meeting house was founded in 1698 with help from the cause in Gosport.  A replacement was built in 1704, and the 800-capacity Kent Street Chapel succeeded this in 1847.  It was bombed in World War II, as were other early chapels on St Thomas's Street (1712) and Clarence Street (1798).  Lake Road Chapel (1813) seated 1,800, making it southern England's largest Baptist church: it too was damaged in the war and a redundant Methodist chapel in North End was bought to replace it.  The congregation of London Road Baptist Chapel (1902), also in North End, joined this church after their building closed in the early 21st century.  In Southsea, a chapel of 1815 was succeeded by Immanuel Baptist Church (1890; rebuilt after war damage and re-registered for worship in 1953), and seceders from the Kent Street chapel founded Elm Grove Baptist Chapel in 1879.  Although it was also lost to wartime bombing, a daughter church founded on Devonshire Avenue survives.  Another 19th-century chapel on Commercial Road in the city centre was succeeded by the Baptist Tabernacle in suburban Copnor in 1921; this was in turn replaced by a new building on the same site in 1937, but the church now has no denominational links.  On the mainland, Cosham's first Baptist church opened in 1904 next to the present building (a converted pub), and the Paulsgrove estate's Baptist church was registered in 1957.  Salem Strict and Particular Baptist Church in Old Portsmouth served Strict Baptists from 1813 until it was bombed in 1940; the city council offered a new site in the suburbs, and the new Salem Baptist Chapel in Buckland opened in 1960.  In the early 18th century, doctrinal disagreement over the Trinity led to a group of Baptists seceding and forming a Unitarian congregation which still survives.  A Presbyterian chapel of 1718 on Old Portsmouth High Street became a Unitarian meeting house, and the congregation continues to worship on the site in a replacement building erected after World War II bombs destroyed the old chapel.

Other Protestant denominations

Another of Britain's major Nonconformist denominations, the United Reformed Church, was founded in 1972 when the Congregational Church and Presbyterian Church of England merged.  Only three congregations still meet in the city—at Buckland (Kingston Road), Drayton and Milton—although several more were active at the time of the union, and Congregationalist worship in the city began in 1754 at a chapel called The Tabernacle on Orange Street, supplemented by a "splendid Georgian chapel" on King Street.  Neither survived into the 20th century.  Former Congregational church buildings at Southsea (Victoria Road South) and Buckland (Sultan Road), the latter built in 1956, closed in the early 21st century and are now in alternative use.  Also in Southsea, Christ Church on Ashburton Road has been demolished.  The Drayton church now shares a building with the local Methodist congregation.

Many smaller Christian denominations and groups are also represented in the city.  Pentecostal congregations meet at the Oasis Church (Elim Pentecostal), a converted cinema used since 1930; Jubilee Church (independent), a former Primitive Methodist chapel reopened in its new guise in 1948, and the King's Church (Assemblies of God).  King's Church is now based at the former Anglican church of St Peter in Somerstown but can trace its history back to the Hebron Pentecostal Church, a "small hall" on Margate Road in Southsea.  There has been a Quaker presence in Portsmouth since 1650, but the city's Quaker community is not as large as that of Southampton.  Meetings take place at a converted house in Hilsea, which replaced a tin tabernacle near  used earlier in the 20th century.  Seventh-day Adventists worship in a former Anglican mission hall in North End; their former church became a Sikh gurdwara in the 1970s.  Spiritualists established a worshipping community in the city in 1901.  The present temple in Southsea dates from 1937, and another exists in Fratton.  Jehovah's Witnesses have worshipped locally since the early 20th century, but their first permanent Kingdom Hall in Southsea dates from 1951 and was supplemented by another in Copnor (registered in 1969).  There are several churches with an Evangelical or Open Brethren character: Gospel halls in Copnor and Drayton, the non-denominational City Life Church, Eastney Evangelical Free Church, Cornerstone Church Portsmouth and the Langstone Church, a Christian fellowship in Milton (registered in 1967 and 1983 respectively).  Other registered places of worship include a Christadelphian meeting hall (1940), the Portsmouth Chapel of the Church of Jesus Christ of Latter-day Saints (1989), the Church of the Nazarene in Cosham (1942), the First Church of Christ, Scientist, Portsmouth (1956), and a meeting room of the Plymouth Brethren Christian Church in Cosham.

Non-Christian religions

Portsea Island was "one of the principal Jewish centres in England" by the end of the 18th century.  Jews established a congregation on the island during the 1730s and registered their first synagogue in 1742.  A larger building replaced it in 1780.  The present synagogue was built behind a house in Southsea in 1936; many fittings and artefacts were moved from the earlier building.  Shia and Sunni Muslim groups have lived in the city for many years and a house in Southsea was registered for worship in 1978.  The congregation moved to a new mosque in the former Plaza Cinema in 2003.  A former Anglican mission hall in Fratton became the Portsmouth Central Mosque in 2003, and a 19th-century chapel at Old Commercial Road became a Muslim academy and mosque three years later.  The Sikh community in Portsmouth became established after World War II and has grown steadily since then, although a much larger group of worshippers exists in Southampton where a former Anglican church has been converted into a gurdwara.  Portsmouth's Sikhs registered their own gurdwara in Southsea in 1974.

Not all places of worship in the city are purpose-built: several secular buildings have been converted for religious use.  A building of 1921 in North End, originally a dance hall, became a Chinese Christian church (True Jesus Church) in the 1980s after nearly 40 years as a garage.  A former bakery was converted into a Spiritualist church in the 1950s.  The chapel on Kingston Road used by the Society of Saint Pius X was built as a branch of Lloyds Bank.  Cosham Baptist Church now occupies a postwar pub called Uncle Tom's Cabin which stood next to the original chapel but which closed in the 1990s.  Two of the city's former cinemas have been converted into places of worship: as well as the Plaza, now occupied by Portsmouth Jame Mosque, the former Grand Cinema on Arundel Street near the city centre is now the Oasis Centre (home of Oasis Church, an Elim Pentecostal congregation).  When originally converted in 1930, the church retained some of the interior layout including the tiered floor.

Religious affiliation
According to the 2011 United Kingdom census, 205,056 lived in Portsmouth.  Of these, 52.18% identified themselves as Christian, 3.49% were Muslim, 0.63% were Hindu, 0.57% were Buddhist, 0.23% were Sikh, 0.11% were Jewish, 0.51% followed another religion, 35.03% claimed no religious affiliation and 7.25% did not state their religion.  The proportion of people in the city who followed no religion was higher than the figure in England as a whole (24.74%), while Christianity, Islam, Judaism, Hinduism, Sikhism and Buddhism all had a lower following than in the country overall: in 2011, 59.38% of people in England were Christian, 5.02% were Muslim, 1.52% were Hindu, 0.79% were Sikh, 0.49% were Jewish and 0.45% were Buddhist.

Administration

Anglican churches
All Anglican churches in the city are part of the Anglican Diocese of Portsmouth, the mother church of which is Portsmouth Cathedral.  The diocese has seven deaneries. With one exception, the Portsmouth Deanery covers all the parish churches throughout the city: All Saints, the Church of the Ascension, the Church of the Holy Spirit, the Church of the Resurrection, St Alban's, St Andrew's, St Cuthbert's with St Aidens, St Faith's, St George's, St James's, St Jude's, St Luke's, St Margaret's Community Church, St Mary's, St Michael and All Angels, St Peter and St Paul's, St Philip's, St Saviour's, St Simon's, St Wilfrid's, and the three churches which make up the North End Team Ministry—St Francis', St Mark's and St Nicholas'.  Christ Church at Widley is part of the Havant Deanery.

Roman Catholic churches
The city's seven Roman Catholic places of worship are part of the Roman Catholic Diocese of Portsmouth, whose seat is Portsmouth Catholic Cathedral, and are split between four parishes, all of which fall under the Portsmouth Pastoral Area of the diocese.  The Cathedral parish covers Portsmouth city centre, the Naval Dockyard and the coastline as far as Clarence Esplanade in Southsea, Somers Town, parts of Fratton and Landport.  The parish of North End, Corpus Christi and Copnor, St Joseph covers the whole of Portsea Island north of this; from Fratton railway station eastwards the southern boundary is Goldsmith Avenue, Milton Park, Warren Avenue and the southern edge of Milton Common.  The parish of Eastney, Our Lady of Lourdes and Southsea, St Swithun covers the east and south of the island, including all of Southsea and Eastney and the southern part of Milton.  The parish of Cosham, St Colman and Paulsgrove, St Paul includes all parts of the mainland within the city boundaries.

Other denominations
Portsmouth's five Methodist churches—at Copnor, Drayon, Eastney, Southsea (Trinity) and Wymering—are part of the 23-church East Solent and Downs Methodist Circuit.  City Life Church and Cosham, Devonshire Avenue, Immanuel and North End Baptist Churches belong to the Southern Counties Baptist Association.  Grace Baptist Church, Paulsgrove Baptist Church and Salem Baptist Chapel are part of GraceNet UK, an association of Reformed Evangelical Christian churches and organisations. Salem Chapel is also affiliated with the Gospel Standard Baptist movement.  Paulsgrove Baptist Church also belongs to two Evangelical groups: the Fellowship of Independent Evangelical Churches (FIEC), a pastoral and administrative network of about 500 churches with an evangelical outlook, and Affinity (formerly the British Evangelical Council), a network of conservative Evangelical congregations throughout Great Britain.  Eastney Evangelical Free Church and Cornerstone Church Portsmouth are also members of FIEC.  Portsmouth Progressive Spiritualist Church and the Portsmouth Temple of Spiritualism belong to the Spiritualists' National Union and are within the organisation's Southern District, which covers Hampshire, the Isle of Wight, Dorset and Wiltshire.

Listed status

As of February 2001, there were 440 listed buildings in the city of Portsmouth: 12 with Grade I status, 31 listed at Grade II* and 397 with Grade II status.  Portsmouth City Council also maintains a register of locally listed buildings which it considers to be of local architectural and historical interest; many churches which are not on Historic England's national list have been awarded locally listed status.

Historic England also publishes an annual "Heritage at Risk Register"—a survey of assets at risk through decay, damage and similar issues.  The churches identified as at risk in the latest update were St Cuthbert's (affected by the poor condition of the bell-tower and church roof), St Luke's (water ingress and damp), St Mary's (structural problems with roofs and windows) and Trinity Methodist Church (water ingress).

Current places of worship

Former places of worship

Notes

References

Bibliography

Further reading

Anglican Cathedral

Anglican history

Churches (general)

Jewish history

Portsmouth
Portsmouth
Portsmouth
Religious buildings in Portsmouth
Places
Portsmouth-related lists